The Bedfordshire County Football League (formed as the Bedford & District League in 1904), is an English football competition for clubs in and close to the county of Bedfordshire. It runs with four divisions (five in the previous two seasons) and is headed by the Premier Division, which is at step 7 (or level 11) of the National League System. The top club in the league may apply for promotion to the United Counties League Division One or the Spartan South Midlands League Division One.

The league runs separate league cups for each division – the Premier Division clubs play for the Britannia Cup, Division One clubs play for the Centenary Cup, Division Two sides compete for the Jubilee Cup, while Division Three teams play in the Watson Shield.

The league is affiliated to the Bedfordshire County Football Association.

Recent divisional Champions

The overall League Champions were awarded the Jubilee Challenge Cup until 1993, when that cup was retired and replaced by the Premier Cup.

In 2002, Divisions Three, Four and Five were merged into two new divisions, Associate Division One and Associate Division Two

After the 2005–06 season, the league changed its name to the Bedfordshire Football League. Along with the name change, the league reorganised its five divisions by incorporating the two primarily reserve divisions (Associate Division One and Two) into the three first team divisions, ultimately creating three divisions of 16 clubs and a bottom division of 17 clubs.

The league reorganised itself again in 2009, extending its name to Bedfordshire County Football League and adding a fifth division, Division Four. The Premier Division now included 16 clubs, while 14 teams competed Divisions One, Two and Three and the new Division Four comprised 13 clubs.

The league crowned only four divisional champions in 2015, returning to five division for the 2015–16 season.

Member Clubs (2021–22)

Premier Division
AFC Kempston Town & Bedford College
AFC Oakley M&DH
Bedford Albion
Biggleswade Reserves
Biggleswade United U23
Caldecote
Cranfield United
Crawley Green Reserves
Elstow Abbey
Flitwick Town
Marston Shelton Rovers
Queens Park Crescents
Riseley Sports F.C
Sharnbrook
Shefford Town & Campton Reserves
Stevington

Division One
Barton Rovers Reserves
Cranfield United Reserves
Flitwick Town Reserves
Henlow
Ickwell & Old Warden
KA Great Barford
Lea Sports PSG Saturday
Pitstone & Ivinghoe Reserves
Potton United Reserves
Sporting Lewsey Park
St Josephs Saturday
Stofold Development
Totternhoe Reserves
Wilstead

Division Two
AFC Bedford United
AFC Kempston Town & BC Reserves
AFC Oakley Reserves
Bedford SA
Brache Phoenix
Clifton
FC Haynes
Harlington Juniors
Renhold
Soccerlise FC
Stopsley United
The 61 F.C. (Luton) Reserves
Wooton Blue Cross

Division Three
Atletico Europa
Caldecote Reserves
CS Rovers
FC Haynes Reserves
FC Polonia (Luton)
Marston Shelton Rovers Reserves
Sandy
Sharnbrook Reserves
Shefford Town & Campton U23
Sporting Carpathians
Wootton Blue Cross Reserves

Division Four
Bedford Santos
Blunham
Catsbrook Wanderers
Elstow Abbey Reserves
Flitwick Town 'A'
Kempston Rovers BCFL
Lea Sports PSG Saturday Reserves
M&DH Clapham Sports Saturday
Shefford Town & Campton 'A'
Square

Division Five
Clifton Reserves
Harlington Juniors Reserves
Luton Panthers
M&DH Clapham Sports Saturday Reserves
Newman United
Revivalist
Sandy Reserves
Sporting Carpathian Reserves
Tunisian Community FC
Woodside FC
Wooton Blue Cross U23

Other Bedfordshire Leagues
Main index: Affiliated Leagues in Bedfordshire
There are a number of other leagues that are affiliated to the Bedfordshire County Football Association.

References
Bibliography

Notes

External links
Official Website
Bedfordshire County League on FA Full-Time

 
Football in Bedfordshire
Football leagues in England
Sports leagues established in 1904
1904 establishments in England